Monheim may refer to the following places in Germany:

Monheim am Rhein, in the Mettmann district, North Rhine-Westphalia
Monheim, Bavaria, in the Donau-Ries district, Bavaria
Monheim Town Hall, the town hall of Monheim, Bavaria.